The 2016–17 Men's FIH Hockey World League Round 1 was the first stage of the 2016–17 edition of the Men's FIH Hockey World League. It was held from April to October 2016.

Singapore

First round
All times are local (UTC+8).

Pool A

Pool B

Second round

7th–9th place semifinal

Seventh place game

Fifth place game

Bracket

Semifinals

Third place game

Final

Final ranking

Suva

Matches were played in a Hockey5s format.

All times are local (UTC+12).

Pool

Prague

All times are local (UTC+2).

Pool

Glasgow

All times are local (UTC+1).

Pool

Antalya

All times are local (UTC+3).

Pool

Accra

All times are local (UTC±0).

Pool

Salamanca

All times are local (UTC−6).

Pool

Third place game

Final

Final ranking

Chiclayo

This Round 1 event also was the fifth edition of the Men's South American Hockey Championship.

All times are local (UTC−6).

Pool

References

External links
Official website (Singapore)
Official website (Suva)
Official website (Prague)
Official website (Glasgow)
Official website (Antalya)
Official website (Accra)
Official website (Salamanca)
Official website (Chiclayo)

Round 1